Alexandrine of Mecklenburg-Schwerin (Alexandrine Auguste; 24 December 1879 – 28 December 1952) was Queen of Denmark from 1912 to 1947, as well Queen of Iceland from 1918 to 1944 as the spouse of King Christian X. She was the paternal grandmother of the current reigning Queen of Denmark, Margrethe II.

Alexandrine was a daughter of Frederick Francis III, Grand Duke of Mecklenburg-Schwerin and Grand Duchess Anastasia Mikhailovna of Russia. She was brought up with simplicity, and her early life was peripatetic, spending summers in Mecklenburg and the rest of the year in the south of France. She married Prince Christian of Denmark in 1898.

Alexandrine became crown princess in 1906 and queen consort of Denmark in 1912. She is not considered to have played any political role, but is described as being intelligent and a loyal support to her spouse. In spite of her German background, she was loyal to her new country and stood by her husband during the German occupation of Denmark during World War II.

Early life

Birth and family

Alexandrine was born a Duchess of Mecklenburg-Schwerin on Christmas Eve of 1879, in the city of Schwerin, the capital of the vast Grand Duchy of Mecklenburg-Schwerin in Northern Germany. Her father was Frederick Francis, Hereditary Grand Duke of Mecklenburg-Schwerin; who was the eldest son of and heir to the reigning Grand Duke Frederick Francis II. Her mother was Grand Duchess Anastasia Mikhailovna of Russia, who was a granddaughter of Emperor Nicholas I of Russia. Alexandrine was her parents' first child, and was born eleven months after their wedding in St. Petersburg. She was born in the Neustädtisches Palais in Schwerin, which was her parents' residence in the city at the time.

Duchess Alexandrine had two younger siblings: her only brother was Duke Frederick Francis, who in 1897 succeeded their father as Grand Duke of Mecklenburg-Schwerin, and her only sister was Duchess Cecilie, who in 1906 married the German Crown Prince Wilhelm of Prussia, eldest son of German Emperor William II. She was also a paternal first cousin of Juliana of the Netherlands. Her mother was the paternal aunt of Princess Irina Alexandrovna of Russia, the wife of Felix Yusupov, one of the murderers of Rasputin.

Childhood and early adulthood 

After their father's succession as Grand Duke upon the death of his father on 15 April 1883, Alexandrine grew up with her brother and sister at the Castle in Schwerin, at the royal residences of Ludwigslust Palace and the Gelbensande hunting lodge, only a few kilometres from the Baltic Sea coast. Her father had a fragile health and suffered badly from dermatitis, asthma and respiratory disorders from an early age. The wet, damp, and cold Northern European climate of Mecklenburg was not good for his health, and as a result, Alexandrine spent a large amount of time with her family away from Mecklenburg, by the Lake Geneva, and in Palermo, Baden-Baden and Cannes in the south of France, where the family owned a large estate, the Villa Wenden. Cannes was favoured at the time by European royalty, including some whom Alexandrine met such as Empress Eugénie of France and her future husband's uncle, Edward VII of the United Kingdom.

First years in Denmark

Engagement and marriage 

It was also in Cannes during the winter visit of 1897 that Duchess Alexandrine met her future husband, Prince Christian of Denmark, the eldest son of Crown Prince Frederick and Crown Princess Louise of Denmark. The two young royals were engaged in Schwerin on 24 March 1897. In April 1897, shortly after the engagement was announced, her father the Grand Duke died suddenly at the age of just 46 years. His sudden death was somewhat shrouded in mystery as it was first reported that he had committed suicide by throwing himself off a bridge. However, according to the official report, he died in his garden when he fell over a low wall during a bout of shortness of breath.
 
The wedding of Duchess Alexandrine and Prince Christian was celebrated on 26 April 1898 in Cannes, when she was 18 years old. They had two children:
 Prince Frederick (1899–1972), later King Frederick IX of Denmark; married Princess Ingrid of Sweden
 Prince Knud (1900–1976), later Knud, Hereditary Prince of Denmark; married Princess Caroline-Mathilde of Denmark

Early years in Denmark 
Upon their arrival in Denmark, the couple were given Christian VIII's Palace at the Amalienborg palace complex in central Copenhagen as their principal residence and Sorgenfri Palace in Kongens Lyngby north of Copenhagen as a summer residence. Furthermore, the couple received Marselisborg Palace in Aarhus in Jutland as a wedding present from the people of Denmark in 1902, the garden of which was to become one of her greatest interests. In 1914, the King and Queen also built the villa Klitgården in Skagen in Northern Jutland.

On 29 January 1906, her husband's grandfather King Christian IX died, and Christian's father ascended the throne as King Frederick VIII. Christian himself became crown prince, and Alexandrine became crown princess.

Queen of Denmark

On 14 May 1912, King Frederick VIII died suddenly in Hamburg, Germany, while returning from a recuperation stay in Nice in Southern France. Alexandrine's husband acceded to the throne as Christian X, and Alexandrine became queen consort of Denmark. She is not considered to have played any political role, but is described as being a loyal support to her spouse.

She was interested in music, and acted as the protector of the musical societies Musikforeningen i København and Den danske Richard Wagnerforening. She was known for her needlework, which she sold for charitable purposes. After the death of her mother-in-law Louise of Sweden in 1926, she succeeded her as the official protector of the various charity organisations founded by Louise. She enjoyed golf and photography.

During World War I, she founded Dronningens Centralkomité af 1914 ("The Queen's Central Committee of 1914") to the support of poor families. The revolution in Russia brought much heartbreak for Alexandrine as three of her uncles, Nicholas, George and Sergey, were killed by the Bolsheviks.

She survived the 1918 flu pandemic.

World War II 

The couple was given great popularity as national symbols during the World War II occupation, which was demonstrated during a tour through the country in 1946. Before the occupation, she and her daughter-in-law were engaged in mobilising the Danish women.

Her rejection of Major General Kurt Himer, Chief of Staff to General Kaupisch on 9 April 1940 became a symbol for her loyalty toward Denmark before her birth country Germany. When General Himer asked for an audience with the monarch, Christian was persuaded to receive him by his daughter-in-law as he would any other, which was supported by Alexandrine. He asked to do so alone, but Alexandrine told him she would interrupt them. When the General was about to leave, she came in; and when he greeted her, she said: "General, this is not the circumstance in which I expected to greet a countryman."

It was reported, that although Alexandrine was seen as shy and disliked official ceremonies, she had a "sharp" intelligence, and she was, together with her daughter-in-law, Ingrid of Sweden, a true support of the monarch and a driving force for the resistance toward the occupation within the royal house. It was also reported, that in contrast to the monarch himself and the Crown Prince, the Queen and the Crown Princess never lost their calm when the nation was attacked.  As she was not the Head of the Royal House, she could show herself in public more than her spouse, who did not wish to show support to the occupation by being seen in public, and she used this to engage in various organisations for social relief to ease the difficulties caused by the occupation. Kaj Munk is quoted to describe the public appreciation of her during World War II with his comment: "Protect our Queen, the only German we would like to keep!"

Later life 

In 1947, she was widowed; she became the first queen dowager of Denmark to opt not to use that title.

She died in Copenhagen as dowager queen of Denmark in 1952 and is interred next to her husband in Roskilde Cathedral.

Titles, styles, honours and arms

Honours

National honours
  German Imperial and Royal Family: Dame of the Imperial and Royal Order of Louise, 1st Class
  House of Mecklenburg-Schwerin: Knight Grand Cross of the Schwerin Royal House Order of the Wendish Crown, Special Class
 : Knight with Collar of the Order of the Elephant
 : Knight Grand Commander of the Order of the Dannebrog
 : Dame of the Royal Family Order of King Christian IX
 : Dame of the Royal Family Order of King Frederick VIII
 : Dame of the Royal Family Order of King Christian X

Foreign honours
 : Grand Cross of the Order of the Falcon
  Russian Imperial Family: Dame Grand Cordon of the Imperial Order of Saint Catherine
  Spanish Royal Family: 1,170th Dame Grand Cross of the Royal Order of Queen Maria Luisa
 : Member of the Royal Order of the Seraphim
 : Recipient of the 70th Birthday Badge Medal of King Gustaf V
 : Recipient of the 90th Birthday Badge Medal of King Gustav V

Ancestors

Notes

References

Citations

Bibliography

External links

 Queen Alexandrine at the website of the Royal Danish Collection at Amalienborg Palace

|-

1879 births
1952 deaths
People from Schwerin
People from the Grand Duchy of Mecklenburg-Schwerin
House of Mecklenburg-Schwerin
House of Glücksburg (Denmark)
Danish people of German descent
Danish people of Russian descent
Danish royal consorts
Burials at Roskilde Cathedral
Duchesses of Mecklenburg-Schwerin
Crown Princesses of Denmark
Queen mothers
Daughters of monarchs

Grand Commanders of the Order of the Dannebrog
Knights Grand Cross of the Order of the Falcon